Johann Nikolauss Weislinger (1691 – 29 August 1755) was a polemical writer.

Life 
He was born at Püttlingen in German Lorraine.  After attending the Jesuit high-school at Strasbourg, he became a private tutor in 1711. From 1713 he studied philosophy at the University of Heidelberg, then took up theology and prepared for ordination as priest under the direction of the Jesuits at Strasburg. Soon after ordination he was appointed parish priest at Waldulm (1726), and in 1730 at Kappelrodeck, but in 1750, on account of severe illness, he was obliged to resign his position.  He died at Kappelrodeck in Baden.

Works 
He was a prolific controversialist, widely read in the writings of his opponents. He was said to have had a keen mind and was quick at repartee in his polemical treatises. His language is said to have been often coarse and rough: he sought "in fine modes of speech from Luther's rhetoric", according to his own statement, to outdo the Protestant controversialists. The most famous of his writings is "Friss Vogel oder stirb!", which he composed when a student of theology; it appeared at Strasburg, 1723, and was often reprinted.

Other polemical writings are:
"Friß Vogel oder stirb!" (Straßburg 1717) 
"Huttenus delarvatus" (Constance and Augsburg, 1730)
"Hochst billig und grundliche Antwort auf die unbillig und grundlose Klagen" (Augsburg, 1733)
"Auserlesene Merkwurdigkeiten von alten und neuen theologischen Marktschreiern" (Strasburg, 1738)
"Schutz- Schrift des scharf angeklagten, doch aber ganz unschuldig befundenen Luthertums" (Strasburg, 1840-). 
He issued a new edition of Kaufmann's "Katholisch ist gut sterben" (Strasburg, 1744).

References

Attribution

1691 births
1755 deaths
18th-century German Roman Catholic priests
German non-fiction writers
People from Püttlingen
Heidelberg University alumni
German male non-fiction writers